Henfield Rock is an offshore rock lying northwest of Robert Island in the South Shetland Islands, Antarctica. It was known to the early 19th century sealers operating from nearby Clothier Harbour, and sometimes included under the name 'Powels Islands' or 'Heywood Islands'.

The feature is named after Captain Joseph Henfield, Master of the American sealing vessel Catharina that visited the South Shetlands in 1820–21.

Location

See also 
 Composite Antarctic Gazetteer
 List of Antarctic islands south of 60° S
 SCAR
 Territorial claims in Antarctica

Maps
 Chart of South Shetland including Coronation Island, &c. from the exploration of the sloop Dove in the years 1821 and 1822 by George Powell Commander of the same. Scale ca. 1:200000. London: Laurie, 1822.
 L.L. Ivanov. Antarctica: Livingston Island and Greenwich, Robert, Snow and Smith Islands. Scale 1:120000 topographic map.  Troyan: Manfred Wörner Foundation, 2009.

External links
Composite Antarctic Gazetteer.

Rock formations of Robert Island
Islands of the South Shetland Islands